MV Cape Wrath (T-AKR-9962) was originally built as a commercial ship in 1982 and sold to the Grace Marine Company with the name Hual Trader. She has a sister ship named MV Cape Washington.

Construction and career 
It served as a merchant ship until it was purchased by the US Department of Transportation, Maritime Administration on 7 April 1993. From there it was later transferred to the Maritime Administrations Ready reserve fleet and assigned to Maryland. Since then it has been activated to serve in bringing vehicles and supplies to Europe where they are air lifted to troops engaged in Iraq and Afghanistan.

Gallery

Further reading
(https://web.archive.org/web/20120612073411/http://www.msc.navy.mil/inventory/ships.asp?ship=59 Ship's official page on Military Sealift Command)
(http://www.navsource.org/archives/09/54/549962.htm Ship photo index) NavSource Online: Service Ship Photo Archive

References

Ships built in Gdynia
1980 ships